Arthur J. Gallagher & Co. (AJG) is an American global insurance brokerage and risk management services firm headquartered in Rolling Meadows, Illinois (a suburb of Chicago). The firm was established in 1927 and is one of the largest insurance brokers in the world.

History
The company dates back to 1927 when Arthur James Gallagher started a brokerage firm in Illinois. The end of World War II brought his three sons, John, James, and Robert, into the business. The company incorporated in 1950 when revenues were $175,000. In 1957, the firm won Beatrice Foods Company as a client.

Despite the stiff competition in a crowded domestic market that put steady downward pressure on property and casualty premiums during the 1990s and dating back to the late 1980s, the firm was still able to record double-digit growth in all but three years from 1990 through 2000, according to Investor's Business Daily.

Gallagher's purchased 16 smaller brokerages during 2000. The firm had grown its presence to include about 50 U.S. cities.

A history and the values of the firm were documented by Robert E. Gallagher and Alison Kittrell in a book called The Gallagher Way, published in 2005 by Marketing Counsel and iUniverse.

In 2010 Gallagher Brazil was established following the company's takeover of Securitas Re of São Paulo from Estater Gestao de Investimentos Ltda.

In July 2015 the firm was ranked third in the Best's Review world's largest brokers list.

In June 2016, it was announced that Gallagher had joined the Fortune 500 for the first time. Gallagher ranks 416 on the list as of 2 June 2021.

In September 2020, Gallagher announced that it was a victim of a ransomware attack.

In February 2021, Gallagher was recognized on the list of World's Most Ethical Companies by independent international arbiter Ethisphere. It was the company's tenth consecutive year of being on the list.

In July 2022, Arthur J. Gallagher & Co. acquired Four Corners Group Inc., a Canadian executive search firm, for an undisclosed amount.

International business

During the first second quarter and the first half of the year, the company improved their profitability margin and posted growth in revenue and in earnings per share. The second quarter of 2016 saw Arthur J. Gallagher & Co. (NYSE: AJG) post an overall organic growth of 3.6% with $939 million in revenue in reported GAAP. Domestically in the United States, the company saw about 3% organic growth.

India 
Arthur J. Gallagher India Limited was incorporated in 2002.
India-
Gallagher service center LLP
Bengaluru, Mumbai, Pune, Shivamogga and Kolhapur.

Singapore

Arthur J. Gallagher & Co. acquired Singapore-based ITI Solutions Pte Ltd. in 2011. ITI is a specialist insurance broker with expertise in marine cargo, political risk, trade credit risk, and specialty lines. ITI was rebranded as Gallagher Singapore.

Singapore branches: Singapore

Europe 
In July 2016, Arthur J. Gallagher acquired an 85% stake in Swedish specialist insurance and reinsurance broker Brim AB. At the time of acquisition, the Scandinavian brokerage posted revenues of $11.4 million and employed under 30 people. Scandinavia is an area of strategic development for Arthur J. Gallagher and this deal bolstered their purchase of Norwegian specialty insurance broker Bergvall Marine AS in December 2013.

United Kingdom 
Between 2010 and 2012 British operations have grown in importance.  In 2012 the UK was the source of 14% of company revenue - $352.3m up 137% versus 2010.  The United States contributes 80% of revenue - $2,006.1m up 24%.  The other 6% came from Australia, Bermuda and Canada ($161.9m up 59%).

Scotland branches: Aberdeen, Ayr, Dumfries, Dundee, Edinburgh, Fort William, Glasgow, Inverness, Kilwinning, Irvine, Newton Stewart and Stirling.

England branches: Birmingham, Bordon, Bournemouth, Brierly Hill, Bristol, Brixham, Chelmsford, Chester, Chichester, Coventry, Croydon, Exeter, Feering, Gloucester, Godalming, Guildford, High Wycombe, Horsham, Ipswich, Leatherhead, Leeds, Leicester, Liss, Liverpool, Newcastle, Norwich, Nottingham, Orpington, Poole, Portsmouth, Rickmansworth, Sevenoaks, Sheffield, Southampton, St. Austell, Swindon, Talbot Green, Wakefield and Wigan.

Channel Islands branches:  Jersey,  Guernsey and Alderney

Northern Ireland branches: Belfast

Wales branches: Cardiff, Llantrisant, Newport, Tonyrefail and Wrexham

Other branches: Isle of Man

In April 2018, Gallagher was announced as the new name sponsor of Premiership Rugby, the top flight of England's rugby union league system. The deal took effect with the 2018–19 season.

Oceania

Australia 
In 2014, Arthur J. Gallagher expanded their brand proposition in Australia with the acquisition and rebranding of OAMPS Insurance Brokers.

Australia branches: Adelaide, Alice Springs, Bacchus Marsh, Ballarat, Beenleigh, Bexley, Brisbane, Cairns, Canberra, Darwin, Dubbo, East Melbourne, Hobart, Horsham, Katherine, Launceston, Mulgrave, Newcastle, Sydney, Perth, Shepparton, Toowoomba, Townsville, Wagga Wagga, Wangaratta, Warragul, and Wollongong.

New Zealand 
In 2014, Arthur J. Gallagher purchased New Zealand nationwide insurance brokerage, Crombie Lockwood,
New Zealand branches: Auckland, Bleinheim, Christchurch, Dunedin, Greymouth, Hamilton, Invercargill, Kaitaia, Kapiti, Kerikeri, Napier, Nelson, New Plymouth, Palmerston North, Queenstown, Takapuna, Tauranga, Wanganui, Wellington, and Whangarei.

North America

Canada 
In February 2015, Arthur J. Gallagher & Co. acquired Ottawa-based Cohen & Lord Insurance Brokers Ltd. The terms of the transaction were not disclosed.

In November 2015, the firm acquired Christie Phoenix Ltd. and their affiliate Discovery Insurance Services Ltd., both located in Victoria B.C. Christie Phoenix is a retail insurance broker founded more than 40 years ago and specializes in providing commercial property and personal lines of insurance service to middle-market and individual clients across British Columbia.

In June 2016, Arthur J. Gallagher & Co. reached a milestone in the Canadian market by rebranding Noraxis group of insurance brokers to Arthur J. Gallagher Canada Limited.

Ethisphere Institute recognizes Arthur J. Gallagher & Co. as one of the World's Most Ethical Companies for the seventh consecutive year.

Canada branches: Calgary, Edmonton, Halifax, London, Markham, New Glasgow, Ottawa, Moncton, Hartland, Toronto, and Winnipeg.

United States 
In August 2017, the firm announced the acquisition of employee benefits insurance agency Ballard Benefit Works, Inc., based in Howell, Michigan.

Caribbean 
Caribbean branches: Antigua, Bermuda, Barbados,Trinidad and Tobago, Dominica, Grenada, Jamaica, St. Lucia, St. Vincent and the Grenadines, as well as St. Kitts and Nevis.

South America

Brazil 
In December 2022, it was announced Arthur J. Gallagher & Co. had acquired the São Paulo-headquartered retail insurance broker, Interbrok Group for an undisclosed sum.

Chile 
Chile branches: Santiago and Viña del Mar.

Colombia 
Colombia branches: Bogota

References

External links 
 

Companies listed on the New York Stock Exchange
Insurance companies of the United States
Reinsurance companies
Financial services companies established in 1927
Companies based in DuPage County, Illinois
Insurance companies based in Illinois
Itasca, Illinois
1927 establishments in Illinois